Jamie Maclachlan (born 1981) is a British actor who has worked extensively in the business but is best known for playing the lead role of Roger Bannister in the Emmy Award nominated film 'Four Minutes', alongside Christopher Plummer.  For his portrayal Maclachlan was on the Emmy Award watch list of 2006 in the category of Outstanding Lead Actor in a Limited Series or Movie, making it to a short list of just 13 pre nominated actors in this category.

Maclachlan is also a part owner of production company MaclachlanWood.

Acting

Maclachlan has had a varied career in Theatre, Television and Film. His full Filmography is listed below.

Stage and screen credits

Filmography

Television

Theatre
2016, Stage, Borachio, Much Ado About Nothing.
2010, Stage, Clyde, BILLY FISKE KING OF SPEED.
2009, Stage, Pirsg, WHISPERING HAPPINESS.
2009, Stage, Macbeth, Macbeth.
2009, Stage, Hunter, FUCHSIA.
2008, Stage, Man 1, UNIDENTIFIED BAGGAGE.
2007, Stage, Menenius, Coriolanus.
2006, Stage, Him, THE WATER IS NO PLACE TO PLAY.
2004, Stage, Sebastian, Twelfth Night.
2004, Stage, Claudio, Much Ado About Nothing.
2004, Stage, Malcolm, Macbeth.
2003, Stage, Halder, Good.

External links
 
Official Website: http://www.jamiemaclachlan.com

Notes

British male film actors
British male television actors
British male stage actors
1981 births
Living people